Capoeta ekmekciae, the Grusinian scraper  is a kind of freshwater cyprinid fish from Turkey. It is known exclusively from the Çoruh River. It was described as a separate species in 2006.

References 

Ekmekciae
Endemic fauna of Turkey
Fish described in 2006